Asheville City Hall,  is a historic Art Deco brick and stone governmental office building located on City-County Plaza in Asheville, North Carolina, United States. It serves as the seat of the government of the City of Asheville. It is located in the Downtown Asheville Historic District and was added to the National Register of Historic Places in 1976. The building's unique shape and colorful exterior have made it an iconic Asheville landmark and a symbol for the city, reflected by the use of its silhouette in the city's seal.

Current use
The building is one of the Art Deco masterpieces of Asheville.  It was designed by renowned architect Douglas Ellington, whose other works in the city include Asheville High School and the First Baptist Church of Asheville. It was constructed from 1926 to 1928. Intended to be a twin to the new Buncombe County Courthouse, the adjacent courthouse was built in a more conservative and classic style, and much taller than the city hall. A wing connecting them together was planned, but never built.  The building still serves the City of Asheville, while the Courthouse has undergone many renovations and expansions.

The City Council Chamber is decorated by five murals by painter Clifford Addams.

See also
National Register of Historic Places listings in Buncombe County, North Carolina

References

External links

City and town halls on the National Register of Historic Places in North Carolina
Art Deco architecture in North Carolina
Government buildings completed in 1926
Skyscrapers in Asheville, North Carolina
Buildings and structures in Asheville, North Carolina
Tourist attractions in Asheville, North Carolina
National Register of Historic Places in Buncombe County, North Carolina
Historic district contributing properties in North Carolina
City and town halls in North Carolina
Skyscraper office buildings in North Carolina